Ángela Altagracia Carrasco Rodríguez (born January 23, 1951) is a Dominican singer. Carrasco was born in Monte Cristi, Dominican Republic. At age 7, she first appeared in an advertising world, singing the theme for a drink to a tune that composed by Salvador Sturla. Carrasco was part of a group of Latin American divas in the 1970s, including Susana Giménez, Charytín Goyco, Iris Chacón, Ednita Nazario, and Yolandita Monge.

Early life and career 

Carrasco moved from her native country to Spain, where she enjoyed success. She had her first hit when she was chosen to play Mary Magdalene together with Camilo Sesto in the first Spanish version of Jesus Christ Superstar in the mid-1970s. She also hit the airwaves in the late 1970s, with songs such as "Cariño Mio" ("Love of Mine") and "Quererte a Ti" ("Loving You"). "Quererte a Ti" in particular gave her much exposure all over Latin America, in the United States and Europe. She later had a great comeback with albums such as Dama del Caribe and Candela, as well as Angela. Her single "Boca Rosa" peaked at number-one in the Billboard Hot Latin Tracks chart in late 1988.

Angela continued to make music, and after her A Puro Dolor, she released a new album, Muy Personal, which included some new songs in new styles as well as remakes of some of her most famous songs such as "No, no hay nadie mas" and "No se como amarle" from Jesus Christ Superstar.  She has also taken several steps into theater. In 1993, Carrasco earned the Lo Nuestro Award for Tropical Female Artist of the Year.

References

External links
[ Her Allmusic page]

1951 births
Living people
20th-century Dominican Republic women singers
Dominican Republic people of Spanish descent
Latin Grammy Lifetime Achievement Award winners
Women in Latin music